SkillSlate or SkillSlate.com was a New York City-based firm that matched individual service providers with customers via the Internet. The firm raised $1.1 million in capital in October 2010 with investments from Canaan Partners and First Round Capital.

SkillSlate helped small individual service providers, such as dog walkers, DJs, handymen, tutors and movers, market themselves on the web. According to a website description, SkillSlate helps the pages of service providers surface more prominently in search engine results. SkillSlate served the New York metropolitan area. Competitors included Craigslist, Geotoko, FoundTown, Closely, Proposable, Resource Nation, Flowtown, Buzzuka, Spoke, GoBuzz, Traindom, Hooray, Thumbtack, and others, as well as classified advertising in newspapers. According to Fortune Magazine, the idea for the site was conceived by venture capitalist Barkek Ringwelski while working at Canaan Partners when he found he could not find a cleaning person; he raised $50,000 from family and friends in May 2009 and launched the firm.

The company was acquired by TaskRabbit in early 2012.

References

External links
 SkillSlate website

Online retailers of the United States
Companies based in New York City
Internet properties established in 2009
Business services companies established in 2009
Business services companies disestablished in 2012
Internet properties disestablished in 2012
2012 mergers and acquisitions
2009 establishments in New York City
2012 disestablishments in New York (state)